The women's 5000 metres T54 event at the 2020 Summer Paralympics in Tokyo took place on 28 August 2021.

Records
Prior to the competition, the existing records were as follows:

Results

Final
The final took place on 28 August 2021, at 10:06:

References

Women's 5000 metres T54
2021 in women's athletics